Gardaneh-ye Jenjan (also Romanized as Gardaneh-ye Jenjān; also known as Jenjān, Jinjūn, and Lenjūn) is a village in Fahlian Rural District, in the Central District of Mamasani County, Fars Province, Iran. At the 2006 census, its population was 39, in 8 families.

References 

Populated places in Mamasani County